The consensus 1960 College Basketball All-American team, as determined by aggregating the results of six major All-American teams.  To earn "consensus" status, a player must win honors from a majority of the following teams: the Associated Press, the USBWA, The United Press International, the National Association of Basketball Coaches, the Newspaper Enterprise Association (NEA), and The Sporting News.

1960 Consensus All-America team

Individual All-America teams

AP Honorable Mention:

 Jay Arnette, Texas
 Walt Bellamy, Indiana
 Carroll Broussard, Texas A&M
 Al Bunge, Maryland
 Al Butler, Niagara
 Frank Burgess, Gonzaga
 Jeff Cohen, William & Mary
 Jimmy Darrow, Bowling Green
 Ralph Davis, Cincinnati
 Dave DeBusschere, Detroit
 Dave Denton, Georgia Tech
 Mark Dumars, Penn State
 Jim Hagan, Tennessee Tech
 Henry Hart, Auburn
 Wayne Hightower, Kansas
 Ron Johnson, Minnesota
 York Larese, North Carolina
 Bobby Joe Mason, Bradley
 Bill McClintock, California
 Don Ogorek, Seattle
 Gary Phillips, Houston
 Tom Sanders, NYU
 Chris Smith, Virginia Tech
 Herschell Turner, Nebraska
 John Werhas, USC

See also
 1959–60 NCAA University Division men's basketball season

References

NCAA Men's Basketball All-Americans
All-Americans